Fajr Capital is a sovereign-backed private equity firm, with a focus on strategic high-growth sectors in key Organisation of Islamic Cooperation (OIC) markets. Headquartered in the Dubai International Financial Centre, Fajr Capital has a diverse portfolio consisting of businesses operating in over 10 key MENA and ASEAN markets, including: Brunei Darussalam, Egypt, Malaysia, Oman, Saudi Arabia, Turkmenistan and United Arab Emirates.

History
Fajr Capital launched in 2009 with the financial backing of prominent sovereign investment bodies: Khazanah Nasional of Malaysia, Brunei Investment Agency and Abu Dhabi Investment Council, and the private Saudi-based firm MASIC.

The company was founded on the basis of a shared vision to unlock the true potential of the Organisation of Islamic Cooperation region. Against this backdrop, Fajr Capital has "developed a robust framework to not only pinpoint the most attractive investment opportunities in the OIC world, but also create significant long-term value for local communities".

With over USD 700m in committed capital, Fajr Capital is led by CEO Iqbal Khan and a team of seasoned investment professionals with a previous track record at global financial services institutions such as HSBC. The company’s Board of Directors, chaired by Adib Al Zamil from the Zamil Group, comprises senior international economic and business leaders.

Portfolio Companies
Fajr Capital has invested in several financial services and real economy companies, including the following announced transactions:

 Bank Islam Brunei Darussalam – Brunei’s largest bank and flagship Islamic financial institution
 Cravia – One of the most successful retail food and beverage franchise operators in the Middle East
 GEMS Education – International education company. GEMS Education is the world’s largest provider of K-12 private education – operating more than 50 schools, educating over 140,000 students and employing over 13,000 people across 19 markets in the Middle East, North America, Europe, Asia and Africa
 MENA Infrastructure – Dedicated infrastructure asset manager focusing on the MENA region and Turkey. The Fund has invested in Alexandria International Container Terminals, United Power Company, Hajr Electricity Production Company, and Sohar Power Company SAOG
 National Petroleum Services – one of the largest regionally owned oilfield service companies, with approximately 1,300 employees
 Tamar Energy – a pioneering renewable energy company focusing on anaerobic digestion and offering a range of composting services

Awards
In 2016, Fajr Capital was presented with a Global Islamic Economy Award for Finance by Hamdan bin Mohammed Al Maktoum, under the patronage of Sheikh Mohammed bin Rashid Al Maktoum.

Fajr Capital was recognised as the "Best Private Equity Firm in the Middle East" in 2015 and 2017 by EMEA Finance. The firm also received the "Best Private Equity Investment in the Middle East" in 2017.

The Asset Magazine awarded Fajr Capital with "the Best Islamic Private Equity House" in May 2014.

In September 2012, Fajr Capital's CEO, Iqbal Khan, received The Royal Award For Islamic Finance, by His Majesty Tuanku Abdul Halim Mu’adzam Shah, the King of Malaysia.

In 2009, Fajr Capital was awarded the Best Private Equity House at the IFN Awards Ceremony.

See also
Noor Menai

References

Investment banks